Ole Rødder (1743–1806) was Norwegian violinist. He became the first paid musician of Bergen's Musikselskabet Harmonien in 1783, serving as concertmaster of the orchestra, which later became the Bergen Philharmonic Orchestra. Rødder was a stadsmusikant (town musician) in Bergen from 1789. He was a regular visitor to the Altona tavern, where the orchestra rehearsed in its early days.

References

Norwegian violinists
Male violinists
Musicians from Bergen
18th-century Norwegian artists
19th-century Norwegian musicians
1743 births
1806 deaths